Braytown may refer to:

Braytown, Dorset
Braytown, Indiana
Braytown, Tennessee